Kołłątaj is a Polish language surname. It is commonly rendered into English without diacritics as Kollataj. The Russian language version is Kollontay.

The surname may refer to:

Hugo Kołłątaj (1750-1812), Polish Roman Catholic priest, social and political activist, political thinker, historian and philosopher
Rafał Kołłątaj
Antoni Kołłątaj
Jan Kołłątaj-Srzednicki

Polish-language surnames

ru:Коллонтай